Tobias Daniels (born November 16, 1982, in Englewood Cliffs, New Jersey) is an American filmmaker.

Tobias is a filmmaker based in Los Angeles. He is the former West Coast videographer for PopStar! Magazine, and has been featured on Indiewire and AFROPUNK.  Prior to stepping behind the lens he struck the famous gloves-over-the-head victory pose playing a young Muhammad Ali for photographer David LaChapelle's poster print of Ali' in G.O.A.T.
He was co-creator of America's first salsa dance video for kids Creative Child Magazine's Preferred Choice Award Winning - Salsa with Me.  In 2012 he executive produced Janked which screened at the Cannes Film Market.  His upcoming Feature Length Documentary on LGBT performance artist: Black Velvet features camera work by Emmy Award winning camera operator Greg Harriott from Born to Explore.

References

External links 

·Official website

1982 births
Living people
American artists
Filmmakers from New Jersey
People from Englewood Cliffs, New Jersey
American LGBT artists